James Philip Knight, Baron Knight of Weymouth,  (born 6 March 1965) is a British politician who served as Minister for the South West and Minister of State for Employment and Welfare Reform from 2009 to 2010. A member of the Labour Party and Co-operative Party, he was Member of Parliament (MP) for South Dorset from 2001 to 2010.

After losing his seat to Richard Drax of the Conservative Party, it was announced Knight would be made a life peer in the 2010 Dissolution Honours. He is now chief education and external officer at TES Global Ltd, and a Visiting Professor at the London Knowledge Lab of the Institute of Education in London.

Education
Knight was educated at Eltham College, an independent school in Mottingham in South-East London, followed by Fitzwilliam College, Cambridge, where he studied Geography, Social & Political Sciences from 1984–87, gaining a BA Hons.

Early career
Knight was Manager of Central Studio in Basingstoke from 1988–90. From 1990–91, he was Director of West Wiltshire Arts Centre Ltd, then Director of Dentons Directories Ltd in Westbury from 1991–2001.

Election history 
Knight first stood for Parliament at the 1997 general election as the Labour Party candidate for South Dorset, but narrowly lost by just 77 votes. He was, however, elected on the same day to Mendip District Council, on which he served until 2001; including as Labour Group leader.

At the 2001 general election, he was elected as the Member of Parliament for South Dorset by 153 votes in the only Labour gain from the Conservatives that year. At the 2005 general election, Knight increased his majority to 1,812 votes, but with a small decrease in his share of the vote. At the 2010 general election, Knight lost his seat to Conservative Richard Drax by 7,443 votes after an 11.4% drop in his share of the vote.

Knight was the campaign co-ordinator for Ed Balls' unsuccessful Labour Party leadership campaign in 2010.

Parliamentary career

Knight was Parliamentary Under-Secretary of State for Rural Affairs, Landscape and Biodiversity in the Department for Environment, Food and Rural Affairs from 2005–06. He then moved to become Minister of State for Schools in the Department for Education and Skills. On 28 June 2007, when Gordon Brown disbanded the department, Knight moved to the newly created Department for Children, Schools and Families, as the Minister for Schools and Learners. In October 2008 following the reshuffle, Knight became a member of the Privy Council.

In 2009, when MPs expenses were revealed following a leak in the Daily Telegraph, Knight was ranked 171 out of 645 in the MPs' expenses list, claiming £155,987 in 2007/2008, compared with £137,970 in 2006/2007, of which £94,135 was for staff, £9,746 was for a communications allowance and £4,993 was for personal living expenses.

In his first Parliament, Jim Knight generally voted in line with party policy, including all major votes such as those on the Iraq war and top-up fees.

Jim Knight held the following positions:
2003–2004 – Parliamentary Private Secretary to Rosie Winterton then Minister of State at the Department of Health
2004–2005 – Parliamentary Private Secretary to the Ministerial Team at the Department of Health
2005–2006 – Parliamentary under Secretary of State for Rural Affairs, the Landscape & Biodiversity
2006–2009 – Minister of State for Schools
2009–2010 – Minister of State for Employment
2009–2010 – Minister for the South West

After politics
Knight was created a Life Peer on 23 June 2010, taking the title Baron Knight of Weymouth, of Weymouth in the County of Dorset.

In April 2014 he stepped down from the Labour front bench in the House of Lords to take up a full-time role as managing director, online learning at TES Global Ltd, building an online professional development and training service for teachers. Knight was subsequently appointed chief education and external officer at TES Global.

In 2011, Knight was appointed as Chair of digital and social inclusion charity Good Things Foundation (then Tinder Foundation). He stood down as chair in 2016 but remains a patron of The Technology, Pedagogy and Education professional association. He is the co-owner of XRapid, an app that diagnoses malaria and is a board member of Apps for Good. He is also the deputy chair of the Nominet Trust, and an honorary associate of the National Secular Society.

References

External links

 Jim Knight – Department for Children, Schools and Families
 Guardian Unlimited Politics – Ask Aristotle: Jim Knight MP
 TheyWorkForYou.com – Jim Knight MP

|-

|-

|-

|-

1965 births
Living people
Alumni of Fitzwilliam College, Cambridge
Councillors in Somerset
Labour Party (UK) life peers
Life peers created by Elizabeth II
Labour Party (UK) MPs for English constituencies
Members of the Privy Council of the United Kingdom
People educated at Eltham College
Politics of Dorset
UK MPs 2001–2005
UK MPs 2005–2010